The 2006 K League Championship was the tenth competition of the K League Championship, and was held to decide the 24th champions of the K League. After the regular season was finished, the first stage winners, the second stage winners, and the top two clubs in the overall table qualified for the championship. Each semi-final was played as a single match, and the final consisted of two matches.

Qualified teams

Bracket

Semi-finals

Seongnam vs Seoul

Suwon vs Pohang

Final

First leg

Second leg

Seongnam Ilhwa Chunma won 3–1 on aggregate.

Final table

See also
2006 in South Korean football
2006 K League

External links
News at K League 
Match report at K League 

 

K League Championship
K